Gilyovo is a rural locality (a selo) and the administrative center of Gilyovsky Selsoviet of Loktevsky District, Altai Krai, Russia. The population was 935 as of 2016. There are 13 streets.

Geography 
It is located on the Aley River, 41 km northeast of Gornyak (the district's administrative centre) by road. Mezhdurechye is the nearest rural locality.

References 

Rural localities in Loktevsky District